This is a list of moths of the family Noctuidae (sensu Kitching & Rawlins, 1999) that are found in Israel. It also acts as an index to the species articles and forms part of the full List of moths of Israel. Subfamilies are listed alphabetically.

Subfamily Acontiinae
Acontia biskrensis (Oberthür, 1887)
Acontia lucida (Hüfnagel, 1766)
Acontia titania (Esper, 1798)
Acontia trabealis (Scopoli, 1763)
Aedia funesta (Esper, 1786)
Aedia leucomelas (Linnaeus, 1758)
Armada maritima Brandt, 1939
Armada nilotica A. Bang-Haas, 1912
Armada panaceorum (Ménétriès, 1849)
Coccidiphaga scitula (Rambur, 1833)
Diloba caeruleocephala (Linnaeus, 1758)
Tarachephia hueberi (Ershov, 1874)

Subfamily Acronictinae
Acronicta aceris (Linnaeus, 1758)
Acronicta psi (Linnaeus, 1758)
Acronicta pasiphae Draudt, 1936
Acronicta rumicis (Linnaeus, 1758)
Acronicta tridens [Denis & Schiffermüller, 1775]
Craniophora ligustri (Denis & Schiffermüller, 1775)
Craniophora pontica (Staudinger, 1879)
Craniophora melanisans Wiltshire, 1980

Subfamily Amphipyrinae
Pyrois effusa (Boisduval, 1828)
Amphipyra pyramidea (Linnaeus, 1758)
Amphipyra micans Lederer, 1857
Amphipyra boursini Hacker, 1998
Amphipyra tetra (Fabricius, 1787)
Amphipyra stix Herrich-Schäffer, 1850

Subfamily Bagisarinae
Ozarba sancta (Staudinger, 1900)
Pseudozarba bipartita (Herrich-Schäffer, 1850)
Pseudozarba mesozona (Hampson, 1896)
Xanthodes albago (Fabricius, 1794)

Subfamily Bryophilinae
Cryphia algae (Fabricius, 1775)
Cryphia ochsi (Boursin, 1941)
Cryphia tephrocharis Boursin, 1953
Cryphia rectilinea (Warren, 1909)
Cryphia amseli Boursin, 1952
Cryphia labecula (Lederer, 1855)
Cryphia raptricula ([Denis & Schiffermüller], 1775)
Cryphia petrea (Guenée, 1852)
Cryphia maeonis (Lederer, 1865)
Cryphia paulina (Staudinger, 1892)
Cryphia amasina (Draudt, 1931)
Simyra dentinosa Freyer, 1839
Victrix tabora (Staudinger, 1892)
Victrix marginelota (de Joannis, 1888)

Subfamily Catocalinae
Acantholipes circumdata (Walker, 1858)
Acantholipes regularis (Hübner, [1813])
Aedia funesta (Esper, [1786])
Aedia leucomelas (Linnaeus, 1758)
Africalpe intrusa Krüger, 1939
Anomis flava (Fabricius, 1775)
Anomis sabulifera (Guenée, 1852)
Antarchaea erubescens (A. Bang-Haas, 1906)
Anumeta arabiae Wiltshire, 1961
Anumeta asiatica Wiltshire, 1961
Anumeta atrosignata (Walker, 1858)
Anumeta hilgerti Rothschild, 1909
Anumeta spilota Ershov, 1874
Anumeta straminea (A. Bang-Haas, 1906)
Anydrophila stuebeli (Calberla, 1891)
Apopestes spectrum (Esper, [1787])
Armada maritima Brandt, 1939
Armada nilotica (A. Bang-Haas, 1906)
Armada panaceorum (Ménétries, 1849)
Autophila anaphanes Boursin, 1940
Autophila cerealis (Staudinger, 1871)
Autophila einsleri Amsel, 1935
Autophila libanotica (Staudinger, 1901)
Autophila ligaminosa (Eversmann, 1851)
Autophila limbata (Staudinger, 1871)
Autophila pauli Boursin, 1940
Catephia alchymista ([Denis & Schiffermüller, 1775)
Catocala amnonfreidbergi (Kravchenko et al., 2008)
Catocala brandti Hacker & Kaut, 1999
Catocala conjuncta (Esper, [1787])
Catocala conversa (Esper, [1787])
Catocala disjuncta (Geyer, 1828)
Catocala diversa (Geyer, [1828])
Catocala editarevayae Kravchenko et al., 2008
Catocala elocata (Esper, [1787])
Catocala eutychea (Treitschke, 1835)
Catocala hymenaea ([Denis & Schiffermüller], 1775)
Catocala lesbia Christoph, 1887
Catocala nymphaea (Esper, [1787])
Catocala nymphagoga (Esper, [1787])
Catocala olgaorlovae Kravchenko et al., 2008
Catocala puerpera (Giorna, 1791)
Catocala separata (Freyer, 1848)
Cerocala sana Staudinger, 1901
Clytie arenosa Rothschild, 1913
Clytie delunaris (Staudinger, 1889)
Clytie haifae (Habich, 1905)
Clytie illunaris (Hübner, [1813])
Clytie infrequens (C. Swinhoe, 1884)
Clytie sancta (Staudinger, 1898)
Clytie scotorrhiza Hampson, 1913
Clytie syriaca (Bugnion, 1837)
Clytie terrulenta (Christoph, 1893)
Crypsotidia maculifera (Staudinger, 1898)
Drasteria cailino (Lefèbvre, 1827)
Drasteria flexuosa (Ménétries, 1847)
Drasteria herzi (Alphéraky, 1895)
Drasteria kabylaria (A. Bang-Haas, 1906)
Drasteria oranensis Rothschild, 1920
Dysgonia algira (Linnaeus, 1767)
Dysgonia rogenhoferi (Bohatsch, 1880)
Dysgonia torrida (Guenée, 1852)
Epharmottomena eremophila (Rebel, 1895)
Exophyla rectangularis (Geyer, [1828])
Gnamptonyx innexa (Walker, 1858)
Grammodes bifasciata (Petagna, 1788)
Heteropalpia acrosticta (Püngeler, 1904)
Heteropalpia profesta (Christoph, 1887)
Iranada turcorum (Zerny, 1915)
Lygephila craccae (Denis & Schiffermüller, 1775)
Lygephila lusoria (Linnaeus, 1758)
Minucia lunaris (Denis & Schiffermüller, 1775)
Minucia wiskotti (Püngeler, 1902)
Ophiusa tirhaca (Cramer, 1777)
Pandesma robusta (Walker, 1858)
Pericyma albidentaria (Freyer, 1842)
Pericyma squalens Lederer, 1855
Plecoptera inquinata (Lederer, 1857)
Plecoptera reflexa Guenée, 1852
Prodotis boisdeffrii (Oberthür, 1867)
Prodotis stolida (Fabricius, 1775)
Rhabdophera arefacta (C. Swinhoe, 1884)
Scodionyx mysticus Staudinger, 1900
Scoliopteryx libatrix (Linnaeus, 1758)
Tarachephia hueberi (Ershov, 1874)
Tathorhynchus exsiccata (Lederer, 1855)
Tyta luctuosa (Denis & Schiffermüller, 1775)
Tytroca dispar (Püngeler, 1904)
Tytroca leucoptera (Hampson, 1896)
Ulotrichopus tinctipennis stertzi (Püngeler, 1907)
Zethes insularis Rambur, 1833

Subfamily Condicinae
Condica capensis (Guenée, 1852)
Condica viscosa (Freyer, 1831)
Condica palaestinensis (Staudinger, 1895)

Subfamily Cuculliinae
Brachygalea albolineata (Blachier, 1905)
Brachygalea kalchbergi (Staudinger, 1892)
Lithophasia quadrivirgula (Mabille, 1888)
Lithophasia venosula Staudinger, 1892
Metlaouia autumna (Chrétien, 1910)
Cucullia syrtana (Mabille, 1888)
Cucullia argentina (Fabricius, 1787)
Cucullia santolinae Rambur, 1834
Cucullia calendulae Treitschke, 1835
Cucullia santonici (Hübner, [1813])
Cucullia boryphora Fischer de Waldheim, 1840
Cucullia improba Christoph, 1885
Cucullia macara Rebel, 1948
Shargacucullia blattariae (Esper, 1790)
Shargacucullia barthae (Boursin, 1933)
Shargacucullia lychnitis (Rambur, 1833)
Shargacucullia anceps (Staudinger, 1882)
Shargacucullia strigicosta (Boursin, 1940)
Shargacucullia macewani (Wiltshire, 1949)
Shargacucullia verbasci (Linnaeus, 1758)
Calocucullia celsiae (Herrich-Schäffer, 1850)
Metalopha gloriosa (Staudinger, 1892)
Metalopha liturata (Christoph, 1887)
Calophasia platyptera (Esper, [1788])
Calophasia barthae Wagner, 1929
Calophasia angularis (Chrétien, 1911)
Calophasia sinaica (Wiltshire, 1948)
Pamparama acuta (Freyer, 1838)
Cleonymia jubata (Oberthür, 1890)
Cleonymia warionis (Oberthür, 1876)
Cleonymia opposita (Lederer, 1870)
Cleonymia pectinicornis (Staudinger, 1859)
Cleonymia baetica (Rambur, 1837)
Cleonymia chabordis (Oberthür, 1876)
Cleonymia fatima (Bang-Haas, 1907)
Teinoptera culminifera Calberla, 1891
Teinoptera gafsana (Blachier, 1905)
Omphalophana antirrhinii (Hübner, [1803])
Omphalophana anatolica (Lederer, 1857)
Omphalophana pauli (Staudinger, 1892)
Recophora beata (Staudinger, 1892)
Metopoceras omar (Oberthür, 1887)
Metopoceras delicata (Staudinger, 1898)
Metopoceras philbyi Wiltshire, 1980
Metopoceras solituda (Brandt, 1938)
Metopoceras kneuckeri (Rebel, 1903)
Metopoceras felicina (Donzel, 1844)
Rhabinopteryx subtilis (Mabille, 1888)
Oncocnemis confusa persica persica Ebert, 1878
Oncocnemis exacta Christoph, 1887
Oncocnemis strioligera Lederer, 1853
Xylocampa mustapha Oberthür, 1920
Stilbia syriaca Staudinger, 1892
Stilbina hypaenides Staudinger, 1892
Hypeuthina fulgurita Lederer, 1855

Subfamily Eriopinae
Callopistria latreillei (Duponchel, 1827)

Subfamily Eublemminae
Calymma communimacula ([Denis & Schiffermüller], 1775)
Eublemma albina (Staudinger, 1898)
Eublemma albivestalis Hampson, 1910
Eublemma apicipunctalis (Brandt, 1939)
Eublemma cynerea (Turati, 1924)
Eublemma cochylioides (Guenée, 1852)
Eublemma cornutus Fibiger & Hacker, 2004
Eublemma deserti Rothschild, 1909
Eublemma gayneri (Rothschild, 1901)
Eublemma gratissima (Staudinger, 1892)
Eublemma hansa (Herrich-Schäffer, 1851)
Eublemma kruegeri (Wiltshire, 1970)
Eublemma ostrina (Hübner, 1808)
Eublemma pallidula (Herrich-Schäffer, 1856)
Eublemma parva (Hübner, 1808)
Eublemma polygramma (Duponchel, 1836)
Eublemma scitula (Rambur, 1833)
Eublemma siticulosa (Lederer, 1858)
Eublemma subvenata (Staudinger, 1892)
Eublemma suppura (Staudinger, 1892)
Eublemma tomentalis Rebel, 1947
Honeyana ragusana (Freyer, 1844)
Rhypagla lacernaria (Hübner, 1813)
Metachrostis dardouini (Boisduval, 1840)
Metachrostis velox (Hübner, 1813)
Metachrostis velocior Staudinger, 1892

Subfamily Eustrotiinae
Eulocastra diaphora (Staudinger, 1879)

Subfamily Euteliinae
Eutelia adulatrix (Hübner, 1813)
Eutelia adoratrix (Staudinger, 1892)

Subfamily Hadeninae
Orthosia cruda Denis & Schiffermüller, 1775
Orthosia cypriaca Hacker, 1996
Orthosia cerasi (Fabricius, 1775)
Perigrapha mundoides (Boursin, 1940)
Egira tibori Hreblay, 1994
Tholera hilaris (Staudinger, 1901)
Anarta sabulorum (Alphéraky, 1882)
Anarta engedina Hacker, 1998
Anarta arenbergeri (Pinker, 1974)
Anarta mendax (Staudinger, 1879)
Anarta mendica (Staudinger, 1879)
Anarta trifolii (Hufnagel, 1766)
Anarta stigmosa (Christoph, 1887)
Cardepia sociabilis (Graslin, 1850)
Cardepia affinis Rothschild, 1913
Thargelia gigantea Rebel, 1909
Odontelia daphnadeparisae Kravchenko, Ronkay, Speidel, Mooser & Müller, 2007
Lacanobia oleracea (Linnaeus, 1758)
Lacanobia softa (Staudinger, 1898)
Sideridis implexa (Hübner, 1813)
Dicerogastra chersotoides (Wiltshire, 1956)
Saragossa siccanorum (Staudinger, 1870)
Hecatera bicolorata (Hufnagel, 1766)
Hecatera weissi (Boursin, 1952)
Hecatera dysodea (Denis & Schiffermüller, 1775)
Hecatera cappa (Hübner, 1809)
Hecatera fixseni (Christoph, 1883)
Enterpia laudeti (Boisduval, 1840)
Hadena magnolii (Boisduval, 1829)
Hadena compta ([Denis & Schiffermüller], 1775)
Hadena adriana (Schawerda, 1921)
Hadena gueneei (Staudinger, 1901)
Hadena clara (Staudinger, 1901)
Hadena persimilis Hacker, 1996
Hadena drenowskii (Rebel, 1930)
Hadena syriaca (Osthelder, 1933)
Hadena perplexa ([Denis & Schiffermüller], 1775)
Hadena silenes (Hübner, 1822)
Hadena sancta (Staudinger, 1859)
Hadena pumila (Staudinger, 1879)
Hadena silenides (Staudinger, 1895)
Mythimna ferrago (Fabricius, 1787)
Mythimna vitellina (Hübner, 1808)
Mythimna straminea (Treitschke, 1825)
Mythimna congrua (Hübner, 1817)
Mythimna languida (Walker, 1858)
Mythimna l-album (Linnaeus, 1767)
Mythimna sicula (Treitschke, 1835)
Mythimna alopecuri (Boisduval, 1840)
Mythimna riparia (Rambur, 1829)
Mythimna unipuncta (Haworth, 1809)
Leucania putrescens (Hübner, 1824)
Leucania punctosa (Treitschke, 1825)
Leucania herrichii Herrich-Schäffer, 1849
Leucania palaestinae Staudinger, 1897
Leucania joannisi Boursin & sporten, 1952
Leucania zeae (Duponchel, 1827)
Leucania loreyi (Duponchel, 1827)
Polytela cliens (Felder & Rogenhofer, 1874)

Subfamily Heliothinae
Chazaria incarnata (Freyer, 1838)
Heliothis viriplaca (Hufnagel, 1766)
Heliothis nubigera (Herrich-Schäffer, 1851)
Heliothis peltigera ([Denis & Schiffermüller], 1775)
Helicoverpa armigera (Hübner, [1808])
Schinia scutosa ([Denis & Schiffermüller], 1775)
Periphanes delphinii (Linnaeus, 1758)
Pyrrhia treitschkei (Frivaldsky, 1835)
Aedophron phlebophora (Lederer, 1858)
Masalia albida (Hampson, 1905)

Subfamily Hypeninae
Nodaria nodosalis (Herrich-Schäffer, [1851])
Polypogon lunalis (Scopoli, 1763)
Polypogon plumigeralis (Hübner, [1825])
Hypena obsitalis (Hübner, [1813])
Hypena lividalis (Hübner, 1796)
Hypena munitalis Mann, 1861
Zekelita antiqualis (Hübner, [1809])
Zekelita ravalis (Herrich-Schäffer, 1851)

Subfamily Hypenodinae
Schrankia costaestrigalis (Stephens 1834)
Schrankia taenialis (Hübner, [1809])

Subfamily Metoponiinae
Aegle semicana (Esper, 1798)
Aegle rebeli Schawerda, 1923
Aegle exquisita Boursin, 1969
Aegle ottoi (Schawerda, 1923)
Megalodes eximia (Freyer, 1845)
Haemerosia renalis (Hübner, 1813)
Haemerosia vassilininei A. Bang-Haas, 1912
Tyta luctuosa [Denis & Schiffermüller, 1775]
Epharmottomena eremophila (Rebel, 1895)
Iranada turcorum (Zerny, 1915)

Subfamily Noctuinae
Euxoa anarmodia (Staudinger, 1897)
Euxoa aquilina (Denis & Schiffermüller, 1775)
Euxoa cos (Hübner, [1824])
Euxoa canariensis (Rebel, 1902)
Euxoa conspicua (Hübner, [1827])
Euxoa distinguenda (Lederer, 1857)
Euxoa foeda (Lederer, 1855)
Euxoa heringi (Staudinger, 1877)
Euxoa nigrofusca (Esper, [1788])
Euxoa oranaria (Bang-Haas, 1906)
Euxoa robiginosa (Staudinger, 1895)
Euxoa temera (Hübner, [1808])
Agrotis spinifera (Hübner, [1808])
Agrotis segetum ([Denis & Schiffermüller], 1775)
Agrotis trux (Hübner, [1824])
Agrotis exclamationis (Linnaeus, 1758)
Agrotis scruposa (Draudt, 1936)
Agrotis alexandriensis Bethune-Baker, 1894
Agrotis herzogi Rebel, 1911
Agrotis haifae Staudinger, 1897
Agrotis sardzeana Brandt, 1941
Agrotis ipsilon (Hüfnagel, 1766)
Agrotis puta (Hübner, [1803])
Agrotis syricola Corti & Draudt, 1933
Agrotis bigramma (Esper, [1790])
Agrotis obesa (Boisduval, 1829)
Agrotis pierreti (Bugnion, 1837)
Agrotis psammocharis Boursin, 1950
Agrotis lasserrei (Oberthür, 1881)
Agrotis boetica (Boisduval, [1837])
Agrotis margelanoides (Boursin, 1944)
Pachyagrotis tischendorfi (Püngeler, 1925)
Dichagyris rubidior (Corti, 1933)
Dichagyris terminicincta (Corti, 1933)
Dichagyris candelisequa ([Denis & Schiffermüller], 1775)
Dichagyris elbursica (Draudt, 1937)
Dichagyris leucomelas Brandt, 1941
Dichagyris melanuroides Kozhantshikov, 1930
Dichagyris melanura (Kollar, 1846)
Dichagyris imperator (Bang-Haas, 1912)
Dichagyris pfeifferi (Corti & Draudt, 1933)
Dichagyris singularis (Staudinger, 1892)
Dichagyris erubescens (Staudinger, 1892)
Dichagyris devota (Christoph, 1884)
Dichagyris amoena Staudinger, 1892
Dichagyris anastasia (Draudt, 1936)
Yigoga romanovi (Christoph, 1885)
Yigoga flavina (Herrich-Schäffer, 1852)
Yigoga nigrescens (Höfner, 1887)
Yigoga libanicola (Corti & Draudt, 1933)
Yigoga truculenta Lederer, 1853
Stenosomides sureyae facunda (Draudt, 1938)
Standfussiana defessa (Lederer, 1858)
Rhyacia arenacea (Hampson, 1907)
Chersotis ebertorum Koçak, 1980
Chersotis elegans (Eversmann, 1837)
Chersotis multangula (Hübner, [1803])
Chersotis capnistis (Lederer, 1872)
Chersotis margaritacea (Villers, 1789)
Chersotis fimbriola (Esper, [1803])
Chersotis laeta (Rebel, 1904)
Ochropleura leucogaster (Freyer, 1831)
Basistriga flammatra (Denis & Schiffermüller], 1775)
Noctua orbona (Hufnagel, 1766)
Noctua pronuba (Linnaeus, 1758)
Noctua comes Hübner, [1813]
Noctua janthina ([Denis & Schiffermüller], 1775)
Noctua tertia Mentzer, Moberg & Fibiger, 1991
Noctua tirrenica (Biebinger, Speidel & Hanigk, 1983)
Noctua interjecta Hübner, [1803]
Epilecta linogrisea ([Denis & Schiffermüller], 1775)
Peridroma saucia (Hübner, [1808])
Eugnorisma pontica (Staudinger, 1892)
Xestia sareptana (Herrich-Schäffer, 1851)
Xestia castanea (Esper, [1798])
Xestia cohaesa (Herrich-Schäffer, [1849])
Xestia xanthographa ([Denis & Schiffermüller], 1775)
Xestia palaestinensis (Kalchberg, 1897)

Subfamily Phytometrinae
Raparna conicephala (Staudinger, 1870)
Antarchaea erubescens (A. Bang-Haas, 1910)

Subfamily Plusiinae
Abrostola clarissa (Staudinger, 1900)
Agrapha accentifera (Lefebvre, 1827)
Autographa gamma (Linnaeus, 1758)
Chrysodeixis chalcites (Esper, [1789])
Cornutiplusia circumflexa (Linnaeus, 1767)
Euchalcia augusta (Staudinger, 1891)
Euchalcia emichi (Rogenhofer, 1873)
Euchalcia aureolineata Ronkay & Gyulai, 1997
Euchalcia augusta (Staudinger, 1891)
Euchalcia maria (Staudinger, 1892)
Euchalcia olga Kravchenko, Müller, Fibiger & Ronkay, 2006
Euchalcia paulina (Staudinger, 1892)
Macdunnoughia confusa (Stephens, 1850)
Trichoplusia vittata (Wallengren, 1856)
Thysanoplusia daubei (Boisduval, 1840)
Thysanoplusia orichalcea (Fabricius, 1775)
Trichoplusia ni (Hübner, [1803])
Trichoplusia circumscripta (Freyer, 1831)

Subfamily Psaphidinae
Valeria oleagina (Denis and & Schiffermüller, 1775)
Valeria josefmooseri Kravchenko, Speidel & Muller, 2006
Valeria thomaswitti Kravchenko, Muller & Speidel 2006
Allophyes benedictina (Staudinger, 1892)
Allophyes asiatica (Staudinger, 1892)

Subfamily Rivulinae
Rivula tanitalis Rebel, 1912
Zebeeba falsalis (Herrich-Schäffer, 1839)

Subfamily Xyleninae
Spodoptera exigua (Hübner, 1808)
Spodoptera cilium (Guenée, 1852)
Spodoptera littoralis (Boisduval, 1833)
Caradrina agrotina (Staudinger, 1892)
Caradrina aspersa (Rambur, 1834)
Caradrina kadenii (Freyer, 1836)
Caradrina syriaca (Staudinger, 1892)
Caradrina panurgia (Boursin, 1939)
Caradrina oberthueri (Rothschild, 1913)
Caradrina ingrata (Staudinger, 1897)
Caradrina flavirena (Guenée, 1852)
Caradrina scotoptera (Püngeler, 1914)
Caradrina hypostigma (Boursin, 1932)
Caradrina amseli (Boursin, 1936)
Caradrina clavipalpis (Scopoli, 1763)
Caradrina selini Boisduval, 1840
Caradrina levantina Hacker, 2004
Caradrina zandi (Wiltshire, 1952)
Caradrina fibigeri Hacker, 2004
Caradrina atriluna (Guenée, 1852)
Caradrina zernyi (Boursin, 1936)
Caradrina flava (Oberthür, 1876)
Caradrina casearia (Staudinger, 1900)
Caradrina kravchenkoi Hacker, 2004
Caradrina vicina (Staudinger, 1870)
Caradrina alfierii (Boursin, 1937)
Caradrina melanurina (Staudinger, 1901)
Caradrina bodenheimeri (Draudt, 1934)
Hoplodrina ambigua [Denis & Schiffermüller, 1775]
Scythocentropus eberti Hacker, 2001
Scythocentropus inquinata (Mabille, 1888)
Diadochia stigmatica Wiltshire, 1984
Heterographa puengeleri Bartel, 1904
Catamecia minima (C. Swinhoe, 1889)
Dicycla oo (Linnaeus, 1758)
Atethmia ambusta [Denis & Schiffermüller, 1775]
Atethmia centrago (Haworth, 1809)
Eremotrachea bacheri (Püngeler, 1902)
Anthracia eriopoda (Herrich-Schäffer, 1851)
Mormo maura (Linnaeus, 1758)
Polyphaenis propinqua (Staudinger, 1898)
Olivenebula subsericata Herrich-Schäffer, 1861
Chloantha hyperici [Denis & Schiffermüller, 1775]
Phlogophora meticulosa (Linnaeus, 1758)
Pseudenargia regina (Staudinger, 1892)
Pseudenargia deleta (Osthelder, 1933)
Apamea monoglypha (Hufnagel, 1766)
Apamea syriaca (Osthelder, 1933)
Apamea polyglypha (Staudinger, 1892)
Apamea leucodon (Eversmann, 1837)
Apamea platinea (Herrich-Schäffer, 1852)
Apamea anceps [Denis & Schiffermüller, 1775]
Mesoligia literosa (Haworth, 1809)
Luperina dumerilii (Duponchel, 1826)
Luperina kravchenkoi Fibiger & Müller, 2005
Luperina rjabovi (Kljutschko, 1967)
Margelana flavidior F. Wagner, 1931
Gortyna gyulaii Fibiger & Zahiri, 2006
Oria musculosa (Hübner, 1809)
Monagria typhae (Thunberg, 1784)
Lenisa geminipuncta (Haworth, 1809)
Lenisa wiltshirei (Bytinski-Salz, 1936)
Arenostola deserticola (Staudinger, 1900)
Sesamia ilonae Hacker, 2001
Sesamia cretica Lederer, 1857
Sesamia nonagrioides (Lefèbvre, 1827)
Episema tamardayanae Fibiger, Kravchenko, Mooser, Li & Müller, 2006
Episema lederi Christoph, 1885
Episema didymogramma (Boursin, 1955)
Episema ulriki Fibiger, Kravchenko & Müller, 2006
Episema korsakovi (Christoph, 1885)
Episema lemoniopsis Hacker, 2001
Leucochlaena muscosa (Staudinger, 1892)
Leucochlaena jordana Draudt, 1934
Ulochlaena hirta (Hübner, 1813)
Ulochlaena gemmifera Hacker 2001
Eremopola lenis (Staudinger, 1892)
Tiliacea cypreago (Hampson, 1906)
Xanthia pontica Kljutshko, 1968
Maraschia grisescens Osthelder, 1933
Agrochola litura (Linnaeus, 1761)
Agrochola rupicarpa (Staudinger, 1879)
Agrochola osthelderi Boursin, 1951
Agrochola macilenta (Hübner, 1809)
Agrochola helvola (Linnaeus, 1758)
Agrochola pauli (Staudinger, 1892)
Agrochola scabra (Staudinger, 1892)
Agrochola hypotaenia (Bytinsky-Salz, 1936)
Agrochola lychnidis [Denis & Schiffermüller, 1775]
Agrochola staudingeri Ronkay, 1984
Conistra acutula (Staudinger, 1892)
Conistra veronicae (Hübner, 1813)
Jodia croceago [Denis & Schiffermüller, 1775]
Lithophane semibrunnea (Haworth, 1809)
Lithophane lapidea (Hübner, 1808)
Lithophane ledereri (Staudinger, 1892)
Xylena exsoleta (Linnaeus, 1758)
Xylena vetusta (Hübner, 1813)
Evisa schawerdae Reisser, 1930
Rileyiana fovea (Treitschke, 1825)
Dryobota labecula (Esper, 1788)
Scotochrosta pulla [Denis & Schiffermüller, 1775]
Dichonia pinkeri (Kobes, 1973)
Dichonia aeruginea (Hübner, 1808)
Dryobotodes eremita (Fabricius, 1775)
Dryobotodes carbonis (F. Wagner, 1931)
Dryobotodes tenebrosa (Esper, 1789)
Pseudohadena eibinevoi Fibiger, Kravchenko & Muller, 2006
Pseudohadena jordana (Staudinger, 1900)
Pseudohadena commoda (Staudinger, 1889)
Antitype jonis (Lederer, 1865)
Ammoconia senex (Geyer, 1828)
Aporophyla canescens (Duponchel, 1826)
Aporophyla nigra (Haworth, 1809)
Aporophyla australis (Boisduval, 1829)
Aporophyla dipsalea Wiltshire, 1941
Dasypolia ferdinandi Rühl, 1892
Polymixis manisadjiani (Staudinger, 1882)
Polymixis subvenusta (Püngeler, 1906)
Polymixis juditha (Staudinger, 1898)
Polymixis rebecca (Staudinger, 1892)
Polymixis steinhardti Kravchenko, Fibiger, Mooser & Müller, 2005
Polymixis ancepsoides Poole, 1989
Polymixis rufocincta (Geyer, 1828)
Polymixis trisignata (Ménétriès, 1847)
Polymixis serpentina (Treitschke, 1825)
Polymixis apora (Staudinger, 1898)
Polymixis lea (Staudinger, 1898)
Polymixis aegyptiaca (Wiltshire, 1947)
Polymixis epiphleps (Turati & Krüger, 1936)
Mniotype compitalis (Draudt, 1909)
Mniotype judaica (Staudinger, 1898)
Mniotype johanna (Staudinger, 1898)
Boursinia discordans (Boursin, 1940)
Boursinia deceptrix (Staudinger, 1900)
Boursinia lithoxylea (A. Bang-Haas, 1912)
Wiltshireola praecipua Hacker & Kravchenko, 2001
Ostheldera gracilis (Osthelder, 1933)
Metopoplus excelsa (Christoph, 1885)

See also
Noctuidae
Moths
Lepidoptera
List of moths of Israel

External links
 
 The Acronictinae, Bryophilinae, Hypenodinae and Hypeninae of Israel
 
 The Noctuinae of Israel
 The Plusinae of Israel
 Heliothinae of Israel
 Hadeninae of Israel
 Images
 Images, genus Catocala in Israel
 Eublemminae of Israel
 Checklist of Noctuidae of Israel

Noctuidae